This is a list of titles published by Plaion publishing label and division Prime Matter.

List of video games

References 

Plaion
Prime Matter